DKV may refer to:
Danske Kvindeforeningers Valgsretsudvalg (Danish Women's Society's Suffrage Committee), later Danske Kvindeforeningers Valgretsforbund
Debreceni Közlekedési Vállalat, provider of  public transport in Debrecen, Hungary
Deutscher Karate Verband German Karate Federation
 DKV Deutsche Krankenversicherung, German insurance company, part of the Ergo Group
 DKV Euro Service (de), German B2B mobility service provider, originally Deutscher Kraftverkehr (German motor transport), part of the DKV Mobility Services Group
 DKV Double Kebab Vomit, modern slang. The consequence of eating too much Turkish fast food on an intoxicated night out. Origin 1994.